Macodes is one of a few genera of the orchid family known as jewel orchids. These terrestrial orchids grows in the rainforest floor of Southeast Asia with high humidity and low light. They can also be found in New Guinea, Vanuatu, the Solomon Islands and the Ryukyu Islands. The plant is cultivated for the veined leaves, unlike most other orchids that are valued for the flowers.

Species
The species accepted as of June 2014 include:

 Macodes angustilabris J.J.Sm. – Borneo
 Macodes celebica Rolfe – Sulawesi
 Macodes cominsii (Rolfe) Rolfe – Solomons
 Macodes cupida Ormerod – Vietnam
 Macodes dendrophila Schltr. – New Guinea, Solomons
 Macodes limii J.J.Wood & A.L.Lamb – Sabah
 Macodes megalantha Ormerod – New Guinea
 Macodes obscura Schltr. – New Guinea
 Macodes petola (Blume) Lindl. – Thailand, Malaysia, Indonesia, Philippines, Ryukyu Islands 
 Macodes pulcherrima Schltr. – New Guinea
 Macodes sanderiana (Kraenzl.) Rolfe – Indonesia, New Guinea, Solomons, Vanuatu

References

External links 

Goodyerinae
Cranichideae genera